Chapra Assembly constituency may refer to 
 Chapra, Bihar Assembly constituency
 Chapra, West Bengal Assembly constituency